The following is a list of publicly traded companies having the greatest market capitalization. In media, they are described as being the most valuable companies, a reference to their market value.

Market capitalization is calculated from the share price (as recorded on selected day) multiplied by the number of outstanding shares. Figures are converted into USD millions (using rate from selected day) to allow for comparison.

Trillion-dollar companies
The table below lists all companies which have, at any point, had a market capitalization in excess of $1 trillion, the date on which their market cap first exceeded $1 trillion and their record market cap.

Publicly traded companies 
All market capitalization figures are in USD millions. Only companies with free float of at least 15% are included, value of unlisted stock classes is excluded. Investment companies are not included in the list.

2022 
This list is up to date as of December 31, 2022. Indicated changes in market value are relative to the previous quarter.

2021 
This list is up to date . Indicated changes in market value are relative to the previous quarter.

2020 
This Financial Times–based list is up to data . Indicated changes in market value are relative to the previous quarter.

2019 
This Financial Times–based list is up to date . Indicated changes in market value are relative to the previous quarter.

2018 
This Financial Times–based list is up to date  . Indicated changes in market value are relative to the previous quarter.

2017 
This Financial Times–based list is up to date  . Indicated changes in market value are relative to the previous quarter.

2016 
This Financial Times–based list is up to date  . Indicated changes in market value are relative to the previous quarter.

2015 
This Financial Times–based list is up to date  . Indicated changes in market value are relative to the previous quarter.

2014 
This Financial Times–based list is up to date  . Indicated changes in market value are relative to the previous quarter.

2013 
This Financial Times–based list is up to date as of December 31, 2013. Indicated changes in market value are relative to the previous quarter.

2012 
This Financial Times–based list is up to date as of December 31, 2012. Indicated changes in market value are relative to the previous quarter.

2011 
This Financial Times–based list is up to date as of December 31, 2011. Indicated changes in market value are relative to the previous quarter.

2010 
This Financial Times–based list is up to date as of December 31, 2010. Indicated changes in market value are relative to the previous quarter.

2009 
This Financial Times–based list is up to date as of December 31, 2009. Indicated changes in market value are relative to the previous quarter.

2008 
This Financial Times–based list is up to date as of December 31, 2008. Indicated changes in market value are relative to the previous quarter.

2007 
This Financial Times–based list is up to date as of December 31, 2007. Indicated changes in market value are relative to the previous quarter.

2006 
This Financial Times–based list is up to date as of December 2006. Indicated changes in market value are relative to the previous quarter.

2005 
This Financial Times–This list is up to date as of 31 March 2005.

2004 
This Financial Times–based list is up to date as 31 March 2004.

2003 
This Financial Times–based list is up to date as December 2003.

2002 
This Financial Times–based list is up to date December 2002.

2001 
This Financial Times–based list is up to date as 31 March 2001.

2000 
This Financial Times–based list is up to date as 31 March 2000.

1999 
The 10 largest companies in the world by market capitalization in 1999 - Statista

1998 
This Financial Times–based list is up to date as of 30 September 1998.

1997 
This Financial Times–based list is up to date as of 30 September 1997.

1996 
This Financial Times–based list is up to date as of 30 September 1996.

See also 
 List of countries by stock market capitalization
 List of largest companies by revenue
 List of largest employers
 List of largest corporate profits and losses
 List of wealthiest religious organizations
 Corporate capitalism
 World Economic Forum
 Fortune Global 500

Notes

References 

Corporations by market capitalization
Market capitalization
Companies, Market Capitalization
Financial markets
Economy-related lists of superlatives